Alphonza Gadsden Sr. (born 1945) is an American Anglican bishop. From 2007 to 2020, he was bishop ordinary of the Reformed Episcopal Church's Diocese of the Southeast.

Biography
Gadsden was born to Silas and Leola Gadsden in Russellville, South Carolina, and grew up in St. Stephen in the Reformed Episcopal Church. He graduated from Russellville High School. He served in the U.S. Army during the Vietnam War and reached the rank of sergeant. Gadsden received his undergraduate degree from Limestone University, his M.Div. from Cummins Theological Seminary, and did doctoral work at Erskine Theological Seminary, and was awarded the Doctor of Divinity, honoris causa from from the Theological Commission of the Reformed Episcopal Church. He is married to Hester Brown Gadsden.

After his ordination, Gadsden served as vicar and rector of Liberty Reformed Episcopal Church in Jamestown, South Carolina. He later served as president of the Diocese of the Southeast's standing committee. While serving in ordained ministry, Gadsden had a 39-year career in the United States Postal Service and was the first black postmaster in Kingstree, South Carolina.

After the death of Bishop James C. West, Gadsden was elected bishop ordinary of the Diocese of the Southeast and consecrated by Leonard W. Riches on November 17, 2007. During his episcopacy, the diocese added eight clergy members, refurbished its properties, eliminated debts and added two additional parishes. In 2015, Gadsden hosted an Anglican Church in North America dialogue on racial reconciliation in the predominantly black Diocese of the Southeast. In 2020, Gadsden retired and was succeeded by William White as bishop ordinary.

References

1945 births
Living people
Bishops of the Anglican Church in North America
21st-century Anglican bishops in the United States
Bishops of the Reformed Episcopal Church
African-American Christian clergy